Riot on the Grill is the fourth full-length album by the Japanese music group Ellegarden.  It was released on April 20, 2005.

Track listing
 Red Hot - 2:54
 Monster (モンスター) - 3:18
 Snake Fighting - 2:47
 Marry Me - 2:49
 Missing - 3:27
 Bored of Everything - 3:21
 TV Maniacs - 2:50
 Niji (虹, Rainbow) - 3:27
 I Hate It - 3:11
 BBQ Riot Song - 2:06

Charts

References

Ellegarden albums
2005 albums